Pärnu JK Vaprus ladies' team is an Estonian women's association football club in Pärnu. The club currently plays in Naiste Meistriliiga, the first level in the Estonian women's football system.

References

External links
 Official website 

Women's football clubs in Estonia
Sport in Pärnu
Pärnu JK Vaprus